is the 35th studio album by Japanese singer-songwriter Miyuki Nakajima, released in October 2007.

The albums features a smash hit single "Once in a Lifetime" and its B-Side "Here Comes the Ancient Rain", both songs were used in the documentary program entitled Sekai Ururun Taizaiki; Renaissance which was aired by TBS. The lead-off track, "Today, I'm a Novice" is her second contribution for the boy band Tokio which follows an award-winning hit "Ship in the Air".

Track listing
All songs written and composed by Miyuki Nakajima
"" – 5:32
"" – 4:06
"" – 5:51
"" – 5:33
 "Survival Road" – 4:46
 "Nobody is Right" – 5:59
 "Ice Fish" – 4:29
 "Body Talk" – 4:22
"" – 5:56
"" – 5:32
"" – 5:15

Personnel
Miyuki Nakajima – vocals
Kenny Aronoff – drums
Nobuo Eguchi – drums
Matt Laug – drums
Neil Stubenhaus – electric bass
Yasuo Tomikura – electric bass
Reggie Hamilton – woodbass
Michael Landau – electric guitar
Nozomu Furukawa – electric guitar, slide guitar
Michael Thompson – electric guitar, acoustic guitar
Masayoshi Furukawa – acoustic guitar
Randy Kerher – acoustic piano
Jon Gilutin – acoustic piano, electric piano, keyboards, hammond organ
Shingo Kobayashi – acoustic piano, keyboards, hammond organ, computer programming
Ittetsu Gen – violin
Hanako Uesato – violin
Daisuke Kadowaki – violin
Izumiko Fujitani – violin
Yayoi Fujita – violin
Maki Nagata – violin
Kaoru Kuroki – violin
Yoshiko Kaneko – violin
Crusher Kimura – violin
Yuko Kajitani – violin
Leina Ushiyama – violin
Aya Ito – violin
Takao Ochiai – violin
Maiko Hiraoka – violin
Takuya Mori – violin
Nobuko Kaiwa – violin
Tami Janamoto – cello
Masutami Endo – cello
Seigen Tokuzawa – cello
Masahiro Tanaka – cello
Akina Karasawa – cello
Kaori Morita – cello
Masayo Inoue – cello
Mia Minakami – cello
Ichizo Seo – acoustic piano, backing vocals
Satoshi Nakamura – saxophone
Koji Nishimura – trumpet
Taro Shizuoka – trombone
Tomoyuki Asagawa – highland harp, grand harp
Takashi Asahi – tin whistle
Fumikazu Miyashita – backing vocals
Yuiko Tsubokura – backing vocals
Julia Waters – backing vocals
Luther Waters – backing vocals
Johnny Britt – backing vocals
Eric Butler – backing vocals
Will Wheaton – backing vocals
Monalisa Young – backing vocals
Kristle Murden – backing vocals
Terry Wood – backing vocals
Debbie Hall – backing vocals
Karen Harper – backing vocals

Chart position

Miyuki Nakajima albums
2007 albums